Minnitaki Kames Provincial Park is a  nature reserve in Ontario, Canada, designated to protect several distinguishing features, including east–west kame ridges and numerous terraces. It abuts the shores of Minnitaki Lake, with the nearest settlement at Sioux Lookout, about 20 km to the north.

Each of the five large kames, the largest in northwestern Ontario, "is completely covered by an extensive jack pine dominated closed coniferous forest". The largest covers over 12 square kilometres, rising about 30 m above the gently sloping bedrock, which attains elevations between 358 m and 437 m.

These glacial features are related to Lake Agassiz, and were deposited about 9,500 to 10,000 years ago during the Timiskaming Interstadial.

References

External links

Provincial parks of Ontario
Parks in Kenora District
Kames
Nature reserves in Ontario
Protected areas established in 1989
1989 establishments in Ontario